Peter Ollerton (born 20 May 1951 in England) is a former Australian football forward who represented Australia 55 times between 1974 and 1977 scoring 20 goals. He was a member of the Australian 1974 World Cup squad in West Germany and also represented Victoria.

References

External links

1951 births
Living people
English emigrants to Australia
English footballers
Australian soccer players
Australia international soccer players
Australian expatriate sportspeople in England
1974 FIFA World Cup players
National Soccer League (Australia) players
South Melbourne FC players
Footscray JUST players
APIA Leichhardt FC players
Marconi Stallions FC players
Fleetwood Town F.C. players
Preston Lions FC players
Melbourne Knights FC managers
Preston Lions FC managers
Association football forwards
English football managers
Ringwood City SC players